Viktor Terentiev (16 December 1924 – 14 February 2004) was an association footballer from the former Soviet Union who played for FC Dynamo Kyiv and FC Spartak Moscow.

In 1956 Terentiev played couple of games for Ukraine at the Spartakiad of the Peoples of the USSR.

References

1924 births
2004 deaths
Footballers from Moscow
Soviet footballers
Soviet Top League players
FC Tekstilshchik Ivanovo players
FC Spartak Moscow players
FC Dynamo Kyiv players
FC Metalurh Zaporizhzhia players
Soviet football managers
FC Dynamo Kyiv managers
FC Metalist Kharkiv managers
Merited Coaches of Ukraine
Association football forwards